Sir John Hegarty (born 1944) is an advertising executive and a founder of the agency Bartle Bogle Hegarty.

Career 

He joined Cramer Saatchi in 1967, and was a founding shareholder when it became Saatchi & Saatchi. In 1973. he co-founded TBWA, and then in 1982 started Bartle Bogle Hegarty.

He has published two books: Hegarty on Advertising: Turning Intelligence Into Magic and Hegarty on Creativity.

Honours 

He was a President of D&AD in 1989 and in 1994 was given the President's Award.
He appeared as a castaway on the BBC Radio programme Desert Island Discs on 23 June 1991.

He was knighted for his services to the advertising and creative industries in 2007.

Hegarty is a Trustee Emeriti of The Design Museum.

Bibliography

References

External links 
Meet the Author: Sir John Hegarty on creativity in advertising - BBC video interview

1944 births
Place of birth missing (living people)
Living people
British advertising executives
Businesspeople awarded knighthoods
Knights Bachelor